Huddinge IF is a Swedish football club located in Huddinge, a municipality in Stockholm County in east central Sweden.

Background
Huddinge Idrottsförening is the municipality's oldest sports club. Inspired by the 1912 Summer Olympics in Stockholm, Otto Hellkvist founded the club in the same year. For several decades the club had many sections, including bandy, table tennis, cycling, athletics, and skiing. Today Huddinge IF is purely a football club and is one of Stockholm's largest with about 1,200 active members and 70 teams. Successful clubs in Huddinge that owe their origins as sections within Huddinge IF before breaking away from the parent club include Huddinge IK (ice hockey) and Huddinge BT (tennis).

Since their foundation Huddinge IF has participated mainly in the middle and lower divisions of the Swedish football league system.  The club currently plays in Division 2 Södra Svealand which is the fourth tier of Swedish football. They play their home matches at Källbrinks IP in Huddinge.

Huddinge IF are affiliated to the Stockholms Fotbollförbund.

Recent history
In recent seasons Huddinge IF have competed in the following divisions:

2021    – Division II, Södra svealand
2020    – Division II, Södra svealand
2019    – Division II, Södra svealand
2018    – Division II, Södra svealand
2017    – Division II, Södra svealand
2016    – Division II, Södra svealand
2015    – Division II, Södra Svealand
2014	– Division I, Norra
2013	– Division II, Norra Svealand (won the league and was promoted to division I)
2012	– Division III, Södra Svealand (won the league and was promoted to division II)
2011	– Division III, Södra Svealand
2010	– Division III, Östra Svealand
2009	– Division III, Södra Svealand
2008	– Division III, Södra Svealand (came second and played qualifying games for division II)
2007	– Division III, Östra Svealand (came second and played qualifying games for division II)
2006	– Division III, Östra Svealand (came second and played qualifying games for division II)
2005	– Division IV, Stockholm Södra
2004	– Division III, Östra Svealand
2003	– Division III, Östra Svealand
2002	– Division III, Östra Svealand
2001	– Division III, Östra Svealand
2000	– Division III, Östra Svealand
1999	– Division IV, Stockholm Södra
1998	– Division III, Östra Svealand
1997	– Division III, Östra Svealand
1996	– Division II, Östra Svealand
1995	– Division III, Östra Svealand
1994	– Division III, Östra Svealand
1993	– Division III, Östra Svealand

Footnotes

External links
 Huddinge IF – Official website
  Huddinge IF Facebook

Football clubs in Stockholm
Defunct bandy clubs in Sweden
Association football clubs established in 1912
Bandy clubs established in 1912
1912 establishments in Sweden